Nankai District is a district of Tianjin, People's Republic of China. Nankai District borders the Hai River in the east and Chentangzhuang Railway in the west and south.

A number of important Tianjin landmarks lie in the district including the Tianjin Museum, Tianjin Radio and Television Tower, Tianjin Water Park, Tianjin Zoo and Tianjin Olympic Center Stadium. Nankai is also home to the city's most prestigious educational institutions including Tianjin University and Nankai University. The Tianjin New Technology Industrial Area, a 12 square km precinct, is also located in Nankai.

History
Historically, northern parts of Nankai District were located inside the walled city of Tianjin. The Tianfei Palace or Palace of the Queen of Heaven of the Yuan Dynasty was built in north-eastern Nankai in the year 1326. In the Ming Dynasty, the heart of the city of Tianjin was set up in Nankai. Nankai became part of the military garrisons during the Ming and Qing Dynasties and the city wall served as a major defense system against foreign invasion in the late 19th century.

Administrative divisions
There are 12 subdistricts in the district:

Geography
Nankai District is located in the south-west corner of the urban Tianjin, bordered by Hongqiao District to the north, Hebei and Heping Districts to the north-east, Hexi District to the east and Xiqing District to the south-west. The natural topography is characterised by higher elevation in the north of the district and a lower elevation in the south, with the average altitude being 3 metres.

Demographics
Nankai District has been one of the fastest growing districts in Tianjin since the formation of the People's Republic of China. The population was 220,000 in 1949. In 2006, the population was 925,000 and the density was 19621/km2 (50818/sq. mi.).

The rate of population growth has been negative since 1993 with the birth rate averaging 3.97% and death rate registering 4.56% in 2005.

The majority of people in Nankai District are Han Chinese. Small populations of ethnic minorities such as the Hui, Manchu and Mongol peoples also exist.

Transportation

Metro
Nankai is currently served by three metro lines operated by Tianjin Metro:

  - Haiguangsi, Erweilu, Xi'nanjiao 
  - Bianxing, Jieyuanxidao, Xianyanglu, Changhonggongyuan, Guangkaisimalu, Xi'nanjiao , Gulou, Dongnanjiao
  - Huayuan, Wangdingdi, Hongqinanlu, Zhoudengji'nianguan, Tianta

Education

 Tianjin University
 Nankai University

Parks
Tianjin Zoo (天津动物园)
Tianjin Water Park (天津水上公园)
Changhong Park (长虹公园)

References

People's Government of Tianjin Nankai District English Website

Districts of Tianjin